Jeremy McGovern (born 15 April 1992) is an Australian rules footballer who plays for the West Coast Eagles in the Australian Football League (AFL). He is a tall key-position player who has spent most of his career as a defender, although he occasionally plays forward.

McGovern was recruited from the Claremont Football Club with the 44th pick in the 2011 Rookie Draft. He was something of a late bloomer, only making his senior debut for West Coast midway through the 2014 season (aged 22). McGovern has been a fixture in the Eagles' line-up since then, and in 2015 played in the grand final loss to Hawthorn. He was named as a defender in the 2016, 2017, 2018 and 2019 All-Australian teams entrenching himself as one of the best key defenders in the league.

Early life

As a child, McGovern spent four years living in Warburton, a remote community in the Gibson Desert where his father was working for the Clontarf Foundation. He later spent time in Kalgoorlie and Albany, attending North Albany Senior High School. McGovern played his junior football for the North Albany Football Club, in the same teams as two other future AFL players – Josh Bootsma and Marley Williams. He played WAFL colts for Claremont in 2010, as a ruckman.

AFL career
McGovern was drafted by the Eagles with the 44th pick in the 2011 Rookie Draft (held in late 2010). He was elevated to the senior list in November 2013. In late 2013, McGovern showed up for pre-season training significantly overweight, after a holiday to Thailand. He was "banished" from the club and told to pursue an individual training routine if he wished to continue his career, eventually losing 10 kg and regaining the trust of the coaching staff.

In his fourth year on West Coast's playing list, McGovern finally made his senior debut for the club in round six of the 2014 season, against Carlton at Etihad Stadium. He was dropped for the next game, but returned in round twelve against Hawthorn as a like-for-like replacement for Josh Kennedy (who had a fractured cheekbone). McGovern kicked 10 goals across the next four games, and held his spot for the rest of the year. Overall he managed 13 games in 2014, playing predominantly as a swingman in a similar vein to how Adam Hunter was used under John Worsfold.

In 2015, McGovern emerged as one of the best contested marks in the game as a result of West Coast's considerable injury list. Injuries to Eric MacKenzie and Mitch Brown meant McGovern was forced back into a key defender role. He performed it with aplomb despite often being undersized and inexperienced compared to some of the best forwards in the game. He emerged as a reliable mark, often going back with the flight of the ball into packs to influence the contest, and he was rewarded with a position in the 40-man All-Australian squad (although he did not make the final team).

In 2016, after a career-best season, McGovern was named as a defender in the 2016 All-Australian team. He was the first Eagles key defender to make the team since Darren Glass in 2011. McGovern set a new overall record for the most contested intercept marks in a season, and recorded the equal-most marks from opposition kicks in 2016 (alongside Easton Wood).

In July 2018, McGovern signed a five-year contract extension with West Coast reportedly worth $5 million. Many clubs were interested in recruiting him, including Fremantle, St Kilda and Sydney. In the West Coast game against Port Adelaide on Saturday 11 August 2018, McGovern kicked a goal after the siren to win the game for the West Coast Eagles.

In Round 23, 2018, McGovern broke the record for most intercept marks in a season by taking his 77th of 2018. The record was previously held by Easton Wood of the Western Bulldogs at 76 and was set in 2015.

Statistics
Statistics are correct to the end of 2022

|-
! scope="row" style="text-align:center" | 2014
|style="text-align:center;"|
| 42 || 13 || 13 || 6 || 114 || 46 || 160 || 84 || 18 || 1.0 || 0.5 || 8.8 || 3.5 || 12.3 || 6.5 || 1.4 || 0
|-  style="background-color: #EAEAEA"
! scope="row" style="text-align:center" | 2015
|style="text-align:center;"|
| 20 || 20 || 3 || 2 || 159 || 110 || 269 || 109 || 24 || 0.2 || 0.1 || 8.0 || 5.5 || 13.5 || 5.5 || 1.2 || 2
|- 
! scope="row" style="text-align:center" | 2016
|style="text-align:center;"|
| 20 || 22 || 3 || 5 || 239 || 100 || 339 || 137 || 32 || 0.1 || 0.2 || 10.9 || 4.5 || 15.4 || 6.2 || 1.5 || 2
|-  style="background-color: #EAEAEA"
! scope="row" style="text-align:center" | 2017
|style="text-align:center;"|
| 20 || 24 || 10 || 14 || 266 || 135 || 401 || 192 || 43 || 0.4 || 0.6 || 11.1 || 5.6 || 16.7 || 8.0 || 1.8 || 3
|- 
| scope=row bgcolor=F0E68C | 2018# ||
| 20 || 24 || 6 || 2 || 259 || 97 || 356 || 169 || 31 || 0.3 || 0.1 || 10.8 || 4.0 || 14.8 || 7.0 || 1.3 || 6
|-  style="background-color: #EAEAEA"
! scope="row" style="text-align:center" | 2019
|style="text-align:center;"|
| 20 || 23 || 1 || 1 || 242 || 101 || 343 || 164 || 36 || 0.0 || 0.0 || 10.5 || 4.4 || 14.9 || 7.1 || 1.6 || 0
|- 
! scope="row" style="text-align:center" | 2020
|
| 20 || 12 || 0 || 0 || 114 || 43 || 157 || 72 || 14 || 0.0 || 0.0 || 9.5 || 3.6 || 13.1 || 6.0 || 1.2 || 2
|-  style="background-color: #EAEAEA"
! scope="row" style="text-align:center" | 2021
|style="text-align:center;"|
| 20 || 15 || 0 || 0 || 196 || 50 || 246 || 111 || 15 || 0.0 || 0.0 || 13.1 || 3.3 || 16.4 || 7.4 || 1.0 || 0
|- 
! scope="row" style="text-align:center" | 2022
|style="text-align:center;"|
| 20 || 10 || 1 || 0 || 111 || 53 || 164 || 67 || 12 || 0.1 || 0.0 || 11.1 || 5.3 || 16.4 || 6.7 || 1.2 || 2
|- class="sortbottom"
! colspan=3| Career
! 163 !! 37 !! 30 !! 1700 !! 735 !! 2435 !! 1105 !! 225 !! 0.2 !! 0.2 !! 10.4 !! 4.5 !! 14.9 !! 6.8 !! 1.4 !! 17
|}

Notes

See also
List of AFL debuts in 2014
List of West Coast Eagles players

References

External links

WAFL playing statistics

1992 births
Living people
West Coast Eagles players
West Coast Eagles Premiership players
Australian rules footballers from Western Australia
People from Albany, Western Australia
North Albany Football Club players
Claremont Football Club players
East Perth Football Club players
All-Australians (AFL)
One-time VFL/AFL Premiership players